The Lannan Literary Awards are a series of awards and literary fellowships given out in various fields by the Lannan Foundation. Established in 1989, the awards are meant "to honor both established and emerging writers whose work is of exceptional quality", according to the foundation. The foundation's awards are lucrative relative to most awards in literature: the 2006 awards for poetry, fiction and nonfiction each came with $150,000, making them among the richest literary prizes in the world.

The awards reflect the philosophy governing the Lannan Foundation, a family foundation established by J. Patrick Lannan, Sr. in 1960. It describes itself as "dedicated to cultural freedom, diversity and creativity through projects which support exceptional contemporary artists and writers, as well as inspired Native activists in rural indigenous communities."

Awards have been made to acclaimed and varied literary figures such as David Foster Wallace, William Gaddis, Lydia Davis, William H. Gass, Steve Erickson and W. S. Merwin. The foundation has also recognized people known as much for their public intellectual activities as for their literary talents, such as Barbara Ehrenreich and Edward Said.

The foundation also gives a "Cultural Freedom Prize" for the stated purpose of recognizing "people whose extraordinary and courageous work celebrates the human right to freedom of imagination, inquiry, and expression." Prize winners include Claudia Andujar, Helen Caldicott, Julián Cardona, Elouise P. Cobell, Mahmoud Darwish, Roxanne Dunbar-Ortiz, Robert Fisk, Eduardo Galeano, Arundhati Roy, Bryan Stevenson and Cornel West.

The foundation does not accept applications for awards or fellowships. Candidates are suggested anonymously "by a network of writers, literary scholars, publishers, and editors," with the foundation's literary committee making the final determination.

The foundation also "provides financial assistance to tribes and nonprofits that serve Native American communities..." For instance, it gave more than $7 million in grants to the Blackfeet Reservation Development Fund from 1998 to 2009, to support litigation on behalf of Native Americans with interests in trust lands. This nonprofit was created by Elouise P. Cobell and her legal team to bring claims against the United States for mismanaging lands held in trust for Native Americans. The Cobell v. Salazar case was filed in 1996 and settled in 2009.

Lannan Literary Award for Poetry

1989: Peter Levitt
1989: George Evans
1989: Cid Corman
1990: Seamus Heaney
1990: Derek Mahon
1991: Pattiann Rogers
1991: William Bronk
1991: Chrystos
1991: William Bronk
1992: Luis J. Rodriguez
1992: Susan Mitchell
1992: Suzanne Gardinier
1992: Killarney Clary
1992: Thomas Centolella
1992: A. R. Ammons
1993: Benjamin Alire Sáenz
1993: Denise Levertov
1993: Cyrus Cassells
1994: Richard Kenney
1994: Jack Gilbert
1994: Linda Hogan
1994: Eavan Boland
1994: Simon Armitage
1995: Li-Young Lee
1995: Arthur Sze
1995: Carol Ann Duffy
1995: Hayden Carruth
1996: Donald Justice
1996: William Trevor
1996: Lucille Clifton
1996: Anne Carson
1997: Ken Smith
1998: Mary Oliver
1998: Jon Davis
1998: Frank Bidart
1999: Louise Glück
1999: C. D. Wright
1999: Dennis O'Driscoll
2000: Jay Wright
2000: Herbert Morris
2002: Peter Dale Scott
2002: Alan Dugan
2004: Peter Reading
2005: Pattiann Rogers
2006: Bruce Weigl
2008: August Kleinzahler
2012: Dennis O'Driscoll
2014: Claudia Rankine
2015: A. Van Jordan
2016: Tyehimba Jess
2017: Shane McCrae
2019: Evie Shockley
2020: Carolyn Forché

Lannan Literary Award for Fiction

1989: John Berger
1990: John Hawkes
1991: John Edgar Wideman
1991: Alexander Theroux
1991: Sandra Cisneros
1992: Gilbert Sorrentino
1992: Frank Chin
1993: Paul West
1993: Carole Maso
1993: Denis Johnson
1993: Rikki Ducornet
1994: Stephen Wright
1994: Caryl Phillips
1994: Steven Millhauser
1994: Edward P. Jones
1995: Alice Munro
1995: Mary Morrissy
1995: Louis de Bernières
1996: David Foster Wallace
1996: Tim Pears
1996: Howard Norman
1997: Grace Paley
1997: Anne Michaels
1997: John Banville
1998: Lois-Ann Yamanaka
1998: Stuart Dybek
1998: Lydia Davis
1998: J. M. Coetzee
1999: Joanna Scott
1999: Richard Powers
1999: Jamaica Kincaid
1999: Gish Jen
2000: Leslie Marmon Silko
2000: Cynthia Ozick
2000: David Malouf
2000: Robert Coover
2003: John McGahern
2003: Alistair MacLeod
2003: Edward P. Jones
2004: Rikki Ducornet
2006: Kathryn Davis
2007: Susan Straight
2007: A. L. Kennedy
2016: John Keene
2016: Kevin Barry
2021: Deborah Levy
2021: Rabih Alameddine

Lannan Literary Award for Nonfiction

1989: Wendell Berry
1990: Barry Lopez
1991: Christopher Hitchens
1992: Noam Chomsky
1993: Terry Tempest Williams
1993: Edward Hoagland
1994: Jonathan Kozol
1995: Richard K. Nelson
1995: Scott Russell Sanders
1996: Charles Bowden
1996: David Abram
1997: David Quammen
1998: Howard Zinn
1998: Lawrence Weschler
1998: Chet Raymo
1999: Gary Paul Nabhan
1999: Jared Diamond
2000: Carl Safina
2000: Bill McKibben
2001: Barbara Ehrenreich
2002: Lewis Hyde
2002: Wade Davis
2003: Rebecca Solnit
2004: Luís Alberto Urrea
2005: David G. Campbell
2005: Adam Hochschild
2006: Tim Flannery
2007: Mike Davis
2019: Nick Estes

Lannan Literary Award for An Especially Notable Book 

2005: The New American Militarism: How Americans are Seduced by War, by Andrew J. Bacevich
2008: Democracy Incorporated: Managed Democracy and the Specter of Inverted Totalitarianism, by Sheldon Wolin
2008: Living with Darwin: Evolution, Design, and the Future of Faith, by Philip Kitcher
2008: Black Mass: Apocalyptic Religion and the Death of Utopia, by John N. Gray
2014: Goliath: Life and Loathing in Greater Israel, by Max Blumenthal
2016: From #BlackLivesMatter to Black Liberation, by Keeanga-Yamahtta Taylor
2017: Democracy in Chains: The Deep History of the Radical Right's Stealth Plan for America, by Nancy MacLean

Lannan Literary Fellowship

1991: Pattiann Rogers
1993: William Everson
2001: George Saunders
2001: Lorrie Moore
2001: David Wong Louie
2001: Deborah Levy
2001: Barbara Ehrenreich
2002: Rubén Martínez
2002: Lewis Hyde
2002: David James Duncan
2002: Ahdaf Soueif
2002: Naomi Shihab Nye
2002: James Alan McPherson
2002: James Galvin
2002: Ann Cummins
2003: Mary Rakow
2003: Chris Offutt
2003: Linda Gregg
2003: George Evans
2003: Deborah Eisenberg
2003: Chris Abani
2004: Rebecca Seiferle
2004: Micheline Aharonian Marcom
2004: Mavis Gallant
2004: Thomas Frank
2004: Edwidge Danticat
2005: Freeman House
2005: Judy Budnitz
2005: Nadeem Aslam
2006: Frank X Walker
2006: Brian Turner
2006: Peter Orner
2006: Charles C. Mann
2006: Elizabeth Kolbert
2006: Chris Hedges
2007: Jeremy Scahill
2007: Sinéad Morrissey
2007: Dinaw Mengestu
2007: Edie Meidav
2007: Daniel Alarcón
2007: Paula Gunn Allen
2008: Glenn Patterson
2008: Ilya Kaminsky
2008: Katie Ford
2008: Charles D'Ambrosio
2009: Valzhyna Mort
2009: Sarah Lindsay
2010: Michael McGriff
2010: C. E. Morgan
2011: Atsuro Riley
2011: Sherwin Bitsui
2012: Kate Moses
2012: Natalie Diaz
2013: Andrew N. Rubin
2014: Jill McDonough
2014: Jamaal May
2014: Adrian Matejka
2014: Mitchell S. Jackson
2015: Layli Long Soldier
2015: Mark Nowak
2015: Philip Metres
2015: Sara Baume
2016: Ocean Vuong
2016: Solmaz Sharif
2016: Craig Santos Perez
2016: Don Mee Choi
2018: Doireann Ní Ghríofa
2018: Jacob Shores-Argüello
2018: Claire Vaye Watkins
2019: Nick Estes
2019: Caitriona Lally
2019: Wayétu Moore
2020: Hanif Abdurraqib
2020: Rigoberto González
2020: Isabella Hammad
2020: Nguyễn Phan Quế Mai
2020: Novuyo Rosa Tshuma

Lannan Lifetime Achievement Award

1989: Kay Boyle
1993: William Gaddis
1996: R. S. Thomas
1997: William H. Gass
1998: John Barth
1999: Adrienne Rich
2000: Evan S. Connell
2001: Edward Said
2001: Robert Creeley
2002: Peter Matthiessen
2002: John Berger
2004: W. S. Merwin
2006: Gilbert Sorrentino
2007: Anne Stevenson
2014: Joseph Stroud
2014: Steve Erickson
2018: John Edgar Wideman
2021: Yusef Komunyakaa

See also
American literature
American poetry
List of poetry awards
List of literary awards
List of years in poetry
List of years in literature

Notes

External links
Lannan Foundation, official web site.
Lannan Awards and Fellowships

American poetry awards
American fiction awards
American non-fiction literary awards
Awards established in 1989
Literary awards honoring writers
Literary awards honoring lifetime achievement